Namdaemunno, also known as Namdaemun-ro, is a major thoroughfare in the central districts of Seoul, South Korea and a two-way road consisting of 8 lanes. With a 2 km length and a 40∼50m width, Namdaemunno originates at Bosingak in Jongno-gu and terminates at Seoul Station in Jung-gu.

Historical buildings on this street include  the Gwangtonggwan, the oldest continuously operating bank building in Korea. It was registered as  one of city's protected monuments on March 5, 2001.

See also
List of streets in Seoul
Sejongno
Namdaemun

References

External links
 Namdaemunno at the Naver map

Streets in Seoul
Neighbourhoods of Jung-gu, Seoul